Dale Allen Vesser (born September 10, 1932) is a retired lieutenant general in the United States Army. He served as Director for Strategic Plans and Policy (J-5) for the Joint Chiefs of Staff from 1985 until his retirement in 1987.

Vesser was commissioned in 1954 after graduation from the United States Military Academy with a B.S. degree in military science. Awarded a Rhodes Scholarship, he completed a B.A. degree in political science at Oxford University in 1957. Vesser also earned an M.A. degree in economics from Oxford University.

Vesser served in Vietnam from 1966 to 1967 and again from 1970 to 1971. He was awarded the Silver Star, Distinguished Flying Cross, Bronze Star, Purple Heart and 40 Air Medals. Vesser also received the Defense Distinguished Service Medal, two Army Distinguished Service Medals, two Defense Superior Service Medals, three awards of the Legion of Merit and three Meritorious Service Medals.

After retirement from active duty, Vesser served during the George H. W. Bush administration as Assistant Under Secretary of Defense for Resources and Plans.

References

1932 births
Living people
People from Los Angeles
United States Military Academy alumni
American Rhodes Scholars
Alumni of the University of Oxford
United States Army Rangers
United States Army personnel of the Vietnam War
Recipients of the Air Medal
Recipients of the Distinguished Flying Cross (United States)
Recipients of the Silver Star
Recipients of the Meritorious Service Medal (United States)
Recipients of the Legion of Merit
United States Army generals
Recipients of the Defense Superior Service Medal
Recipients of the Distinguished Service Medal (US Army)
Recipients of the Defense Distinguished Service Medal
United States Department of Defense officials
Military personnel from California